AIDS amendments of 1988, better known as the Health Omnibus Programs Extension (HOPE) Act of 1988, is a United States statute amending the Public Health Service Act. The Acquired Immune Deficiency Syndrome amendments were compiled as Title II - Programs with Respect to Acquired Immune Deficiency Syndrome within the HOPE Act of 1988. The Title II Act appropriated federal funding for Acquired Immune Deficiency Syndrome (AIDS) education, prevention, research, and testing. The U.S. legislative title provisioned the establishment of the presidentially appointed National Commission on AIDS.
The S. 2889 legislation was passed by the 100th U.S. Congressional session and signed by President Ronald Reagan on November 4, 1988.

History
The Acquired Immune Deficiency Syndrome was officially recognized on June 5, 1981, when the U.S. Centers for Disease Control and Prevention (CDC) published a clinical article in the CDC's Morbidity and Mortality Weekly Report. The CDC article acknowledged five young males in the Los Angeles, California, area who were infected with the cytomegalovirus and an infrequent form of Pneumocystis Carinii Pneumonia (PCP).

On July 3, 1981, The New York Times published a report concerning forty-one males with scarce cases of Kaposi's sarcoma in California and New York. By the close of 1981, there had been two hundred and seventy cases of severe immune deficiency cases in males across the United States. Of the two hundred and seventy cases, one hundred and twenty-one of those cases resulted in mortality rates in the United States.

On April 13, 1982, the first U.S. congressional hearings were conducted on the Acquired Immune Deficiency Syndrome by U.S. Representative Henry Waxman. By September, U.S. Representatives Phillip Burton and Henry Waxman provided U.S. legislation to fund five million for opportunistic infection surveillance by the Centers for Disease Control and Prevention and ten million for Acquired Immune Deficiency Syndrome research by the National Institutes of Health.

The 1982 U.S. Congressional deliberations concluded on December 17, 1982, when the 97th Congressional session passed the Orphan Drug Act of 1983.

Provisions of the Amendments
The AIDS amendments established policy for five primary elements with respect to the Acquired Immune Deficiency Syndrome.

Subtitle A: Research Programs
Title XXIII - Research with respect to Acquired Immune Deficiency Syndrome established surveyable protocols for clinical research, clinical toxicology, and therapeutic drug monitoring.
Research programs established by Title II - Programs with Respect to Acquired Immune Deficiency Syndrome
 Establishment of clinical research review committee
 Establishment of clinical evaluation units at the National Institute of Health
 Use of investigational new drugs with respect to the Acquired Immune Deficiency Syndrome
 Community based evaluations of experimental therapies including private industry and Schools of Medicine
 Evaluation of certain treatments regarding effectiveness and risks of foregoing treatments with respect to the Acquired Immune Deficiency Syndrome
 Provision for international support including the global strategy of the Pan American Health Organization and World Health Organization Special Programme on Acquired Immune Deficiency Syndrome
 Establishment of research centers by public and nonprofit research entities
 Research center information services
(a.) Toll-free telephone communications for health care entities
(b.) Data bank on research information
(c.) Data bank on clinical trials and treatments
(d.) Requirements regarding data bank research information
 Development of model protocols for clinical care of infected individuals
 Establishment of National Blood Resource Education Program
 Establishment of research training including fellowships and programs conducted by the National Institute of Mental Health

Subtitle B: Health Services
Title XXIV - Health services with respect to Acquired Immune Deficiency Syndrome is composed of three segments providing preventive medicine protocols for opportunistic infections.
 Part A - Formula Grants to States for Home and Community-Based Health Services
 Establishment of program
 Allotments for states
 Purpose of grants
 Eligible Individual - an individual infected with the etiologic agent for the Acquired Immune Deficiency Syndrome being medically dependent or chronically dependent.
 (A.) Medically Dependent, with respect to an individual, has been certified by a physician attesting routine use of appropriate medical services including home intravenous drug therapy to prevent the individual's deterioration of physical health or cognitive function due to infection from the etiologic agent of the Acquired Immune Deficiency Syndrome.
 (B.) Individual is adept to avoid long-term or frequent inpatient care at a hospital, nursing facility, or other institution if home and community-based health services are provided to individual.
 (A.) Chronically Dependent, with respect to an individual, has been certified by a physician attesting the inability to perform due to physical or cognitive impairment including two daily living tasks being bathing, dressing, toileting, transferring, and eating due to infection from the etiologic agent of the Acquired Immune Deficiency Syndrome.
 (B.) Individual having similar level of disability due to cognitive impairment as defined by the Secretary.
 Home and Community-Based Health Services - with respect to an eligible individual, skilled health services provided in the individual's home pursuant a written plan of care by a health care professional for health management provisions as described;
 (A) durable medical equipment
 (B) homemaker or home health aide services and personal care services provided in the individual's home
 (C) day treatment or other partial hospitalization services
 (D) home intravenous drug therapy including prescription drugs administered intravenously as part of such palliative care
 (E) routine diagnostic tests administered in the individual's home
 Part B - Subacute Care
 Subacute Care - medical and health care services which are required for individuals recovering from acute care episodes that are less intensive than the level of care provided in acute care hospitals, skilled nursing care, hospice care, and other health services provided in long-term facilities.
 Part C - Counseling and Testing
 Grants for anonymous testing
 Requirement of provision for certain counseling services
 Counseling before testing
 Counseling of individuals with negative test results
 Counseling of individuals with positive test results
 Rule of construction with respect to counseling without testing
 Prevention demonstration projects for individuals with positive test results

Subtitle C: Prevention
Title XV - Prevention of Acquired Immune Deficiency Syndrome has two primary parts providing requisites with respect to the prevention of opportunistic infections.
 Part A - Formula Grants to States
 Use of Funds for Prevention Programs
 (a.) Establishment of education and information programs to prevent, reduce exposure to, and the transmission of the etiologic agent for the Acquired Immune Deficiency Syndrome.
 (b.) Education and information programs acquiring funds by the criteria of this title shall include significant content and knowledge concerning the detrimental and unhealthy effects of promiscuous sexual activity, intravenous substance abuse, and the benefits of abstinence or sexual abstinence from such activity.
 (c.) Education and information programs acquiring funds by the criteria of this title shall not be utilized to encourage or promote directly heterosexual or homosexual endeavors and intravenous substance abuse experimentation.
 (d.) Education programs shall be constructed to provide accurate information concerning various means to reduce an individual's risk of exposure to or the transmission of the etiologic agent for the Acquired Immune Deficiency Syndrome with regards that any informational materials are not obscene.
Subsections (b) and (c) are not to be construed to restrict the ability or intent of an education program with respect to the Acquired Immune Deficiency Syndrome.
 Establishment of program
 Allotments for states
 Provisions with respect to carrying out purpose of grants
 Requirement of submission of application concerning certain agreements and assurances
 Restrictions on use of grant
 Requirement of reports and audits by states
 Determination of amount of allotments for states     
 Failure to comply with agreements
 Prohibition against certain false statements
 Technical assistance and provision by Secretary of Supplies and Services in lieu of grant funds
 Part B - National Information Programs
 Availability of national information to general public
 (a.) Comprehensive Information Plan - Centers for Disease Control and Prevention is to annually prepare a comprehensive plan for a National Acquired Immune Deficiency Syndrome Information Program. 
 (b.) Clearinghouse - Centers for Disease Control and Prevention is to establish a clearinghouse for the Acquired Immune Deficiency Syndrome information which shall be made available to Federal agencies, States, public and private entities, and the general public.
 (A.) Clearinghouse is to develop and obtain educational materials, model curricula, and methods directed to reducing the transmission of the etiologic agent for the Acquired Immune Deficiency Syndrome.
 (B.) Clearinghouse is to provide instruction and support for individuals who provide instruction in methods and techniques of education relating to the prevention of Acquired Immune Deficiency Syndrome and instruction in the use of the materials and curricula.
 (C.) Clearinghouse is to conduct or provide the conduct for the curricula, materials, and methods including the efficacy of such curricula, materials, and methods in preventing infection with the etiologic agent for the Acquired Immune Deficiency Syndrome.
 (c.) Toll-Free Telephone Communications - Establishment of 24-hour toll-free telephone communications to provide information and respond to queries from the general public concerning the Acquired Immune Deficiency Syndrome.
 Public information campaigns
 Provision of information to underserved populations

Subtitle D: National Commission on Acquired Immune Deficiency Syndrome
 Establishment of National Commission on Acquired Immune Deficiency Syndrome

Subtitle E: General Provisions
 Requirement of study with respect to minority health and Acquired Immune Deficiency Syndrome
 Establishment of office with respect to minority health and Acquired Immune Deficiency Syndrome
 Health Resources and Services Administration
 Information for health care and public safety workers
 (a) Development and dissemination of guidelines
 (b) Use in occupational standards as emphasized in the Occupational Safety and Health Act of 1970
 (c) Development and dissemination of model curriculum for emergency response employees (EREs)
 Continuing education for health care providers
 Provide technical assistance to public and nonprofit private entities carrying out programs, projects, and activities relating to the Acquired Immune Deficiency Syndrome.
 Miscellaneous provisions
 (a) Public health emergency fund
 (b) Certain use of funds
 Prohibits funds from being used to provide individuals with hypodermic needles or syringes for the use of illegal drugs, unless the Surgeon General determines that a demonstration needle exchange program is effective in reducing drug abuse and the risk that the public will become infected with the etiologic agent for Acquired Immune Deficiency Syndrome.
 (c) Report on certain ethical issues
 Congressional Biomedical Ethics Board will report on ethical issues associated with the administration of hydration and nutrition to fatal patients.
 (d) Study of States laws
 (A) Confidentiality and disclosure of information with respect to the counseling and testing records of individuals regarding the etiologic agent for Acquired Immune Deficiency Syndrome.
 (B) Discrimination against individuals infected with or regarded as being infected with the etiologic agent for Acquired Immune Deficiency Syndrome.

See also

ACT UP
History of HIV/AIDS
HIV/AIDS in New York City
HIV/AIDS in the United States

References

External links
 
 
 
 
 
 
 
 
 
 
 

1988 in law
100th United States Congress
United States federal health legislation
Health policy in the United States
HIV/AIDS in the United States
1988 in the United States